Marko Semren (born 9 April 1954) is the auxiliary bishop of Banja Luka in Bosnia and Herzegovina.

Biography 

In 1973, he entered the Franciscan Order studied philosophy and theology at the Franciscan Institute, Sarajevo. From 1974-1975 he did his National Service and took final vows on 13 April 1980, and on 29 June 1981 was ordained. 
 
Then studied at the Pontifical University "Antonianum" in Rome, receiving his Ph.D. in 1986.  He served as master of novices and spiritual father, pastor and guardian of the Franciscan convent in Gorica - Livno.  He taught at the theological institute in Sarajevo.  
On 15 July 2010, appointed by Pope Benedict XVI as auxiliary bishop of Banja Luka, and Bishop of Abaradira.

References 

1954 births
Living people
People from Livno
Croats of Bosnia and Herzegovina
Franciscans of the Franciscan Province of Bosnia
Bishops of Banja Luka
Franciscan bishops
21st-century Roman Catholic titular bishops
Bishops appointed by Pope Benedict XVI
21st-century Roman Catholic bishops in Bosnia and Herzegovina